Julio López (born 13 January 1933) is a Spanish rower. He competed in the men's single sculls event at the 1960 Summer Olympics.

References

1933 births
Living people
Spanish male rowers
Olympic rowers of Spain
Rowers at the 1960 Summer Olympics
Rowers from Barcelona